Alpha Delta Chi is an American national Christian sorority founded at UCLA in 1925.  Its brother fraternity is Alpha Gamma Omega.

History
Alpha Delta Chi was founded in 1925 at the University of California, Los Angeles by ten women.  Their vision was to create a place where Christian women could participate in Greek life without compromising their beliefs, build strong friendships, and most of all, they wanted to create a place which would mirror Christ's love to their community.  The sorority was originally named Areta, which means virtue.  The sorority's purpose is to provide fellowship for Christian college women, to strengthen the spiritual lives of its members, to be a testimony for Christ on each campus.

In 1929, Karin Anderson Dyer and Edith Bishop McAulay, two members of the Alpha chapter of Areta, were attending the University of California, Berkeley as graduate students. The two saw a need for the sorority and with the help of the Alpha chapter, they organized the Beta chapter on February 4, 1929.

The first annual convention of Alpha Delta Chi was held in Berkeley, California, on April 6–7, 1939. At this meeting the National Association of Areta and the National Executive and Advisory Board were formed. The original name of the National Fraternity, Areta, was changed to Alpha Delta Chi at the June 1943 National Convention.

A.D.X. currently has 14 active chapters across the nation, the newest of which is the Alpha Gamma chapter at Kennesaw State University.

List of chapters 
Active chapters of Alpha Delta Chi are noted in bold, inactive chapters noted in italics.

See also
List of social fraternities and sororities

Notes

References

External links
 Alpha Delta Chi national website

Christian fraternities and sororities in the United States
Student organizations established in 1925
Christian organizations established in 1925
1925 establishments in California